USS Tide (AM-125) was an  acquired by the United States Navy for the dangerous task of removing mines from minefields laid in the water to prevent ships from passing.

Tide was an oceangoing minesweeper built during World War II. Named for the cyclic rising and falling of Earth's ocean surface, she was the only U.S. Naval vessel to bear the name.

Tide was laid down on 16 March 1942 at Savannah, Georgia, by the Savannah Machinery and Foundry Company; launched on 7 September 1942; sponsored by Mrs. Ruth Hangs; and commissioned on 9 May 1943.

North African operations
Following shakedown training out of Key West and Norfolk, Tide got underway from Hampton Roads for her first transatlantic voyage. On 17 July 1943, as she steamed in convoy for North Africa, the minesweeper collided with an infantry landing craft — LCI-267 — which she had just provisioned. Damage to the sweeper included sprung plates and two minor hull punctures which were repaired at sea. Tide arrived at Casablanca on 18 July and was soon on her way again escorting a convoy bound for American ports. During the homeward voyage on 29 July, a sonar contact prompted Tide to drop depth charges on what she thought was an enemy submarine. Although a later search revealed an oil slick, no submarine sinking was confirmed.

Stateside operations
Following her arrival at New York on 9 August 1943, Tide operated on the Eastern Sea Frontier until 30 September. In October–November, she made another Atlantic crossing, returning to New York on 25 November. In December, Tide participated in exercises off the coast of Maine and conducted mine warfare training off Yorktown, Virginia. Convoy duties in the waters of the Eastern Sea Frontier and the Caribbean occupied her in January 1944. On the 25th, Tide got underway again for what was to be her longest convoy escort assignment. Departing Charleston, she steamed — via Bermuda and the Azores — for the United Kingdom.

European operations

Tide completed this voyage at Milford Haven, Wales on 10 March 1944 and spent the remainder of the month operating out of Falmouth. In April–May, she escorted convoys in British coastal waters and engaged in exercises with minesweepers of the Royal Navy in preparation for the invasion of Europe. In the last week of May, Tide made sweeps out of Babbacombe Bay. On 5 June, Tide got underway from Tor Bay with Minesweeper Squadron "A", a unit assigned to the Utah Beach area. As the day wore on, Tide swept channels off the Normandy beaches for fire-support ships and continued sweeps the next day, "D-Day". During the night of 6–7 June, she joined other vessels in guarding the Carentan Estuary to prevent the sally of enemy E-boats.

On the morning of 7 June, Tide swept the area inshore and between Îles Saint-Marcouf and Barfleur to clear lanes for fire-support ships. At 09:40, while recovering her gear, Tide drifted over the Cardonet Banks and struck a mine which exploded with such force that she was lifted out of the water. The explosion broke her back, blasted a tremendous hole in her bottom, and tore away all bulkheads below the waterline causing immediate and irreversible flooding. Tides commanding officer — Lt. Cdr. Allard B. Heyward — died soon after the initial explosion, and Lt. Cdr. George Crane — the ship's executive officer — directed efforts to assist the stricken vessel and to rescue survivors.  and  tried to aid Tide, but the ship was beyond saving. When  attempted to tow the damaged ship to the beach, the strain broke her in two. She sank only minutes after the last survivors had been taken off. Her name was struck from the Naval Vessel Register on 29 July.

Awards
Tide received one battle star for World War II service.

See also
List of United States Navy losses in World War II

References

External links

USN Ships - USS Tide (AM-125)
HyperWar: USS Tide (AM-125) Narrative of sinking at Normandy
Ships of the U.S. Navy, 1940-1945 AM-125 USS Tide
USS Tide (AM 125)
Registered Evil - Battle for Fox Green Beach Registered Evil - Battle for Fox Green Beach

 

Auk-class minesweepers of the United States Navy
Ships built in Savannah, Georgia
1942 ships
World War II minesweepers of the United States
World War II shipwrecks in the English Channel
Maritime incidents in June 1944
Ships sunk by mines